The Kolva is a river in Nenets Autonomous Okrug and the Komi Republic in Russia. It is a right tributary of the Usa of the Pechora basin. The area of its basin . The Kolva freezes up in late November and stays under the ice until mid-May.

References

Rivers of the Komi Republic
Rivers of Nenets Autonomous Okrug